Hablemos de Amor (English Let's talk about love) is the 18th studio album by Mexican pop singer Mijares. It was produced by Memo Gil and Pancho Ruiz. It has the song Te ha robado (He has stolen you) written by Mauricio Arriaga and Jorge Eduardo Murguía  and it is the main theme from the telenovela Querida Enemiga (Dear Enemy), besides Leonel García has composed four songs. Mijares signed up with EMI Televisa Music an indefinite contract from this album on.

Track listing
Tracks:
 Olvidarte
 Loco
 Háblame de amor
 Te ha robado
 Sólo por hoy
 Viento
 Despiés
 Alto más alto
 Cada vez que lloras
 No se va
 Como danzar
 Y sigo esperando (Duet with Fernando Arduán)
 Un año más

References

2008 albums
Manuel Mijares albums